Teucrium betchei is a species of flowering plant in the family Lamiaceae, and is endemic to eastern Australia. It is a perennial herb or undershrub with rod-like stems, linear to very narrow lance-shaped leaves and white flowers.

Description
Flowering mainly occurs in summer.

Taxonomy
This germander was first formally described in 1883 by Ferdinand von Mueller who gave it the name Oncinocalyx betchei in the Southern Science Record, from specimens collected in 1883 near the Namoi River at Gunnedah by Ernst Betche. In 2016, Stefan Kattari and Yasaman Salmaki changed the name to Teucrium betchei in the journal Taxon.

Distribution and habitat
Teucrium betchei grows in grassy woodland and on disturbed sites, mainly on the North West Slopes of New South Wales and the Darling Downs of south-eastern Queensland.

References

betchei
Lamiales of Australia
Flora of New South Wales
Flora of Queensland
Plants described in 1883
Taxa named by Ferdinand von Mueller